Marianna Simnett (born 1986) is a Berlin-based multi-disciplinary artist who works with film, installation, drawing, and sculpture. She is best known for her large-scale video installations.

Early life and education
Simnett studied at a musical theatre school as a teenager. She received a BA from Nottingham Trent University in 2007 and an MA from the Slade School of Art in 2013.

Themes
Simnett's work examines the perception and imagination of the (human) body. In the works she has created to date, the themes of sickness and the intervention of medicine figure large. Themes of contamination, disease, violation, sexuality, identity, and metamorphosis  Central to surrealist visions are issues of vulnerability, autonomy, and control. Simnett cites empathy, trauma, catharsis and the embodiment of these as important themes in her practice. Throughout her body of works and the works themselves is a nonlinear narrative of "bodily dread".

Recurring motifs 
Botox figured in Blood In My Milk as well as The Needle and the Larynx, 2016, and Worst Gift, 2017.  A recurring character, Isabel Maclaren appears as Isabel in The Udder and Blood Syncope features prominently as a motif in Simnett's work. Fainting is a central motif in Faint which was later expanded upon with Faint With Light.

Practice 
Simnett works with non-actors: children, farmers, doctors, scientists. She make extensive use of abrupt  transitions from one sequence to another. She offers a fragmented representation of multi-faceted reality. Simnett re-uses footage from early works; Blood In My Milk merges (newly edited) footage from her trilogy (The Udder, Blue Roses and Blood) with Worst Gift (2017), a reprise of The Needle and The Larynx.

Critical commentary 
"Her recent work explores female subjectivity and bodily integrity as they relate to the power dynamics of the medical profession". "employed the forensic and macabre to elicit a visceral reaction from viewers"   Simnett focuses on the dystopic consequences of technology through a psychosexual lens Simnett's work elicits a physical response though its depiction of physiological processes and techniques such as dreamlike sequences contrasted with hyper-real scenarios and the use of music. Simnett induces the same emotions, such as fear, that she enacts in her work. Her work has been said to combine mythic structures with the aesthetics of medical documentaries. "Simnett composes fanciful narratives, employing leaps of logic while creating intentional slippages among her characters’ identities, genders, and physiognomies". References Donna Haraway and Paul B. Preciado. Simnett's consideration of self-preservation mobilizes feminist concerns without becoming prescriptive.

Influences 
Her practice has been influenced by Jenny Holzer, Barbara Kruger and Cindy Sherman. Simnett credits Bruce Nauman with getting her into moving-image work, and cites Derek Jarman as a "huge influence". Simnett has affinity to Mika Rottenberg."Transformation is much more my message than amputation—transformation is through and through my work. Everyone is always becoming something other than themselves.”

Collaborations
In March 2020 Simnett founded Home Cooking alongside Asad Raza (artist).

Works 

Faint (2012), recalls the story of Simnett's grandfather, who escaped death by firing squad by fainting.
Dog (2013)
The Udder single channel HD video, 15 minutes, 30 seconds (2014)  is the first in a trilogy of works that includes Blue Roses and Blood (both 2015). Shot on a robotic dairy farm, it is a clinical account of bovine mastitis and a cautionary tale about female chastity The Udder (2014) is a coming-of-age story set on a small, rural, roboticized dairy farm.
 Blue Roses (2015) goes back and forth between a varicose vein operation and  the creation of a cyborg cockroach Blue Roses’ (2015) premiered summer 2015 at Comar on the Isle of Mull. 
 Blood ( 2015) recalls the history of Emma Eckstein and her treatment by Wilhelm Fliess. It features Lali, an Albanian sworn virgin and references the Kanuni i Lekë Dukagjinit  Blood (2015)is a dreamlike depiction of a nasal surgery that references both a Freudian case study and the Kanun. 
 The Needle and The Larynx (2016)  shows the artist receiving botulinum toxin injection in her larynx to lower her voice.
Faint with Light (2016) is room-size installation that consists of a series of LED lights synchronized to a soundtrack of the artists hyperventilating until she faints Faint with Light is an audio and light installation, a 12-metre wall of bright LED lights the artist deliberately induces syncope through hyperventilation. 
 Worst Gift (2017), a group of thuggish adolescent boys trapped in a dirty hospital are subjected to endless injections to their vocal chords.
 Blood In My Milk (2018) is an immersive 73-minute, five-channel video installation, made between 2014 and 2017 Its characters are surgeons, scientists, children and insects. Blood In My Milk examines fears and (specific) phobias (Blood-injection-injury type phobia). 
 The Bird Game (2019) is a wicked fairy tale in which a loquacious and bloodthirsty crow, voiced by Joanne Whalley, lures six children to a secluded mansion and snares them in a sequence of deranged games. Scored by Oliver Coates, shot on 16mm film by Robbie Ryan (cinematographer), co-written by Marianna Simnett and Charlie Fox.
 Dance, Stanley, Dance (2020) is a digitally animated watercolour inspired by found roadkill. The soundtrack was composed by Daniel Blumberg.
 Tito's Dog (2020) was created during the 2020 global lockdowns, and confronts the artists own identity whilst also continuing her investigation into interspecies relationships.
 Pillow (2020) is a music video for Daniel Blumberg romance shot during lockdown on 16mm, starring found roadkill in Malvern, UK. On a dark country road, a cast of squirrels and birds are struck down one by one by a passing car. Waking from the dead, their broken corpses gather in an erotic congregation beneath the earth.

Exhibitions 
Simnett has had solo exhibitions at Institute of Modern Art, Brisbane, Frans Hals Museum, Haarlem, Kunsthalle Zürich, Copenhagen Contemporary, Museum für Moderne Kunst, New Museum in New York among others.

She has had group exhibitions at the Ming Contemporary Art Museum Shanghai, Serpentine Gallery in London.

Awards
In 2014 she won the Jerwood Foundation's Jerwood/FVU Awards. Jerwood commissioned The Udder (2014) and Blood (2015).

References

1986 births
21st-century British artists
Alumni of the Slade School of Fine Art
Living people
British women artists